Teznarayanpur (also spelled Tejnarayanpur) is a railway terminus on Katihar–Teznarayanpur branch line of Barauni–Katihar section. It is located in Katihar district, Bihar state, India. The station consists of two platforms, which are not well sheltered.

Location 
Teznarayanpur railway station serves Balua Ghatti, a medium size village located in Amdabad Block of Katihar district in Bihar. It pertains to Katihar railway division, part of Northeast Frontier Railway zone of Indian Railways.

Services 

References

External links 
 

Railway stations in Katihar district
Katihar railway division